Sultan-Agha Khanum also in Western sources Corasi was a Safavid queen consort of Kumyk origin, as the second wife of Safavid king Tahmasp I (r. 1524–1576).

Life 
Although she is often referred as of being Circassian heritage, in Persian, the word Cherkes (چرکس, 'Circassian') is sometimes applied generally to Caucasian peoples living beyond Derbent in Dagestan. Her father was Choban b. Budai (d. 1574), Shamkhal of Tarki. She married Tahmasp I , and was the sister of the Safavid-Kumyk noble Shamkhal Sultan, future shamkhals Eldar, Mohammad, Andi and Girai, as well as the mother of princess Pari Khan Khanum and prince Suleiman Mirza (b. 28 March 1554, Nakhchivan). Another brother, Emamqoli Khan was also in Safavid service.

References

Sources
 
 
 
 
 

Iranian people of Circassian descent
Circassian nobility
Safavid queens consort
16th-century Iranian women
16th-century people of Safavid Iran
Kumyks